Aethrodiscus is a genus of African orb-weaver spiders containing the single species, Aethrodiscus transversalis. It was  first described by Embrik Strand in 1913, and has only been found in Central Africa.

References

Araneidae
Monotypic Araneomorphae genera
Spiders of Africa
Taxa named by Embrik Strand